John Wesley Asselstine (June 2, 1895 – November 2, 1966) was a Canadian professional ice hockey player. From 1922–1924 he played with the Saskatoon Sheiks and the Regina Capitals of the Western Canada Hockey League and the Vancouver Maroons of the Pacific Coast Hockey Association.

References

1895 births
1966 deaths
Canadian ice hockey right wingers
Ice hockey people from Ontario
People from Perth, Ontario
Regina Capitals players
Saskatoon Sheiks players
Vancouver Maroons players